This is a list of all the United States Supreme Court cases from volume 434 of the United States Reports:

External links

1977 in United States case law
1978 in United States case law